= Jose Baxeres De Alzugaray =

Argentine-born American chemist

Dr. Jose Baxeres De Alzugaray (1866 - June 12, 1937) was an Argentina-born American chemist who was most noted for his pioneering work in development of vanadium steel. He also produced first synthetic ruby. The New York Times called him "authority on war vessel armor", and an "early advocate of radium in cancer treatment". De Alzugaray immigrated to the United States in 1905.
